Yellow Pine is an unincorporated community in Washington County, Alabama, United States. It is the westernmost settlement in the state of Alabama. The elevation is 239 feet.

Notes

External links
Location of Yellow Pine

Unincorporated communities in Washington County, Alabama
Unincorporated communities in Alabama